Edward Louis Huson (1881-1951), was a male badminton player from England.

Badminton career
Huson born in India was a winner of the All England Open Badminton Championships. He won the 1903 doubles with Stewart Marsden Massey.

References

English male badminton players
1881 births
1951 deaths
British people in colonial India